Hul Kimhuy (born 7 April 2000) is a Cambodian footballer who plays for Visakha in the Cambodian League and the Cambodia national football team.

Club career
Hul Kimhuy made his senior debut in the Cambodian League on 16 March 2019 against Phnom Penh Crown.

International career
Kimhuy made his debut in the 2020 AFC U-23 Championship qualification against Australia on 22 March 2019.

External links 
Hul Kimhuy at NationalFootballTeams

Living people
2000 births
People from Takéo province
Cambodian footballers
Cambodia international footballers
Association football goalkeepers
Competitors at the 2019 Southeast Asian Games
Competitors at the 2021 Southeast Asian Games
Southeast Asian Games competitors for Cambodia